, officially , is a district of Chiyoda, Tokyo, Japan. As of April 1, 2007, its population is 80. Its postal code is 101-0023.

Kanda-Matsunagachō is located on the northeastern part of Chiyoda. It borders Akihabara, Taitō to the north; Taitō, Taitō and Kanda-Izumichō, Chiyoda to the east; Kanda-Sakumachō to the south; Kanda-Hanaokachō to the southwest; and Kanda-Aioichō and Kanda-Neribeichō to the west.

While no station is located within Matsunagachō, the Akihabara Station is located to the south of the district.

Education
 operates public elementary and junior high schools. Izumi Elementary School (和泉小学校) is the zoned elementary school for Kanda-Matsunagachō. There is a freedom of choice system for junior high schools in Chiyoda Ward, and so there are no specific junior high school zones.

References

Districts of Chiyoda, Tokyo